The Jacob Zuma Foundation is a foundation founded by former South African President Jacob Zuma.

Following Zuma's arrest and imprisonment for contempt of court, the foundation has made a public number of statements in support of him. These ranged from denouncing Zuma's sentence, justifying violent protests, which saw 342  been killed, during the 2021 South African unrest, and issuing statements expressing concern for the Zuma's health during his imprisonment. However, the health of the former president is questionable as in 2018 the former president posted a video showing himself being fit to play basketball  Moreover, in 2022, the former president put his own name forward to become the ANC's chairperson, citing that nothing was wrong with his health

The foundation received funds such as R76 million, which was illegally transferred from the Freestate provincial administration to the bank of the foundation. This transfer was done via VNA Consulting, that were to train Community Development Project road contractors. Moreover, the Zondo Commission found that R2 million was sent to VNA Consulting and then to Mr. X. However, the funds ended up in the foundation's account.

References

Jacob Zuma
Foundations based in South Africa
Civic and political organisations based in Johannesburg